Janusz Chwierut (born 21 August 1965 in Kęty) is a Polish politician. He was elected to the Sejm on 25 September 2005, getting 5272 votes in 12 Chrzanów district as a candidate from the Civic Platform list.

See also
Members of Polish Sejm 2005-2007
Members of Polish Sejm 2007-2011

External links
Janusz Chwierut - parliamentary page - includes declarations of interest, voting record, and transcripts of speeches.

1965 births
Living people
People from Oświęcim County
Members of the Polish Sejm 2005–2007
Civic Platform politicians
Members of the Polish Sejm 2007–2011
Kraków University of Economics alumni